The 1954–55 İstanbul Football League season was the 45th season of the league. Galatasaray SK won the league for the 13th time.

Season

References

Istanbul Football League seasons
Turkey
1954–55 in Turkish football